Siobhan Heekin-Canedy (born July 31, 1991) is an American-Ukrainian former ice dancer who competed internationally for Ukraine. With Dmitri Dun, she is a three-time Ukrainian national champion and placed as high as 14th at the World Championships.

Personal life 
Heekin-Canedy became a Ukrainian citizen two months before the 2014 Winter Olympics.

Career 
Due to the scarcity of males in U.S. figure skating, Heekin-Canedy's coach arranged a partnership with a Ukrainian. Heekin-Canedy began competing for Ukraine with Dmitri Zyzak in 2007. After their split, she competed with Alexander Shakalov from 2009 to 2011. They were coached by Galit Chait and Natalia Dubova. Shakalov retired after the 2011 World Championships.

In mid-2011, Heekin-Canedy teamed up with Dmitri Dun. In their first season together, they won the Ukrainian national title and placed 15th at both the 2012 European Championships and 2012 World Championships.

In the 2012–13 season, Heekin-Canedy and Dun finished 12th at the 2013 European Championships and 14th at the 2013 World Championships. Their Worlds placement gave Ukraine a spot in the ice dancing event at the 2014 Winter Olympics.

Heekin-Canedy and Dun retired from competition in March 2014.

Programs

With Dun

With Shakalov

With Zyzak

Competitive highlights

With Dun

With Shakalov

With Zyzak

References

External links 

 
 
 

Sportspeople from Beverly Hills, California
American female ice dancers
Ukrainian female ice dancers
1991 births
Living people
American expatriate sportspeople in Ukraine
Figure skaters at the 2014 Winter Olympics
Olympic figure skaters of Ukraine
Naturalized citizens of Ukraine
Competitors at the 2013 Winter Universiade
21st-century American women